Laevityphis is a genus of sea snails, marine gastropod mollusks in the family Muricidae, the murex snails or rock snails.

Species
The genus Laevityphis contains four species:
Species within the genus Laevityphis include:

 Laevityphis bullisi Gertman, 1969
 †  Laevityphis costaricensis (Olsson, 1922) 
 † Laevityphis gracilis (Conrad, 1833) †
 † Laevityphis jungi Landau & Houart, 2014 †
 Laevityphis libos Houart, 2017
 † Laevityphis linguiferus (Dall, 1890) †
 † Laevityphis ludbrookae Keen & G. B. Campbell, 1964 †
 † Laevityphis muticus (J. de C. Sowerby, 1835) †
 † Laevityphis schencki Keen & G. B. Campbell, 1964 †
 †Laevityphis tepungai (C. A. Fleming, 1943)  
 Laevityphis tillierae'' (Houart, 1985)
 Laevityphis tubuliger (Thiele, 1925)
Species brought into synonymy
 Laevityphis transcurrens Martens, 1902: synonym of Siphonochelus transcurrens'' (Martens, 1902)

References

  Houart, R, Buge, B. & Zuccon, D. (2021). A taxonomic update of the Typhinae (Gastropoda: Muricidae) with a review of New Caledonia species and the description of new species from New Caledonia, the South China Sea and Western Australia. Journal of Conchology. 44(2): 103–147.

External links
 Cossmann, M. (1903). Essais de paléoconchologie comparée. Cinquième livraison. Paris, The author and de Rudeval. 215 pp., 9 pls

 
Muricidae